San Llorente de la Vega is a hamlet located in the municipality of Melgar de Fernamental, in Burgos province, Castile and León, Spain. As of 2020, it has a population of 52.

Geography 

References

Populated places in the Province of Burgos